AnneElise Goetz is an American attorney, TV legal analyst and media personality.

She is a recurring legal analyst and business expert on Dr. Drew On Call and Crime Watch Daily, and frequents the Plugged In segment of Access Hollywood Live, providing social commentary.

In 2016, Goetz was named a Forward Under 40; an award bestowed by her alma mater, recognizing the positive impact she has had on female professionals, and for her specific achievements in helping empower women to seek out leadership positions in government, law, and business.

Goetz received her bachelor's degree in Political Science from the University of Wisconsin–Madison and her J.D. degree from Case Western Reserve University, School of Law, in Cleveland, Ohio. She is a two time recipient of the Young Attorney Award (2012, 2013) and, in 2015, received the Best of the Bar Award.

Goetz resides in Southern California and is a partner at Higgs Fletcher & Mack. She specializes in Real Estate, Finance and Health Care Law and owns a small real estate business, which she runs with her husband.

In addition to her legal career, she is often called upon for her legal and business expertise on radio and television, to provide commentary on a variety of controversial headlines, news stories and high-profile criminal cases.

Television career
From 2013 to 2015, Goetz appeared weekly on One America News Network's The Daily Ledger, as the show's legal expert.

In 2014, she became a weekly panelist on Dr. Drew On Call.

In 2016, she began contributing on the Wild About Trial segments on Crime Watch Daily and the Plugged In segment of Access Hollywood Live, alongside host Billy Bush.

Personal life
Goetz lives with her husband in San Diego, California. The two run a small real estate business and have two children together.

References

Living people
People from Dayton, Ohio
American women lawyers
University of Wisconsin–Madison College of Letters and Science alumni
Case Western Reserve University School of Law alumni
Year of birth missing (living people)
21st-century American women